Because It's There is an album by Martin Carthy, released in 1979. It was re-issued by Topic Records on CD in 1995.

Track listing
All songs "Traditional; arranged by Martin Carthy" unless noted otherwise.  The Roud number refers to the Roud index of folk songs number and the Child number is from the Child Ballad numbering. 
 "Nothing Rhymed" (Gilbert O'Sullivan) – 2:10
 "May Song" (Roud 305) – 2:49
 "Swaggering Boney" (instrumental) – 2:46
 "Lord Randall" (Roud 10, Child 12)  – 4:16
 "Long John, Old John and Jackie North" (Roud 3100, Child 251) – 6:05
 "Jolly Tinker" (Roud 863)– 3:01
 "Lovely Joan" (Roud 592)– 3:14
 "Three Cripples" (Roud 2422)– 3:06
 "Siege of Delhi" (instrumental) – 4:18
 "Nothing Rhymed" (reprise) (Gilbert O'Sullivan) – 1:18
 "Death of Young Andrew" (Roud 6740, Child 48) – 8:37

Personnel
Martin Carthy – vocals, acoustic guitar, mandolin (6), electric guitar (7)
John Kirkpatrick – accordion (1,7,8,10), concertina (2,6)
Howard Evans – trumpet (6,7)
Bruce Rowland – percussion (2,9)
uncredited – jew's harp (6)
Technical
Ashley Hutchings – production
Jerry Boys - engineer
Keith Morris - photography

Carthy, Kirkpatrick and Evans appeared on Carthy's Album Out of the Cut released in 1984 and followed on as three fifths of the band Brass Monkey.

References

External links
https://mainlynorfolk.info/martin.carthy/records/becauseitsthere.html

1979 albums
Martin Carthy albums
Topic Records albums